Sir Alexander Sprot, 1st Baronet,  (24 April 1853 – 8 February 1929) was a British soldier and Scottish Unionist Party politician. He served in the Second Anglo-Afghan War, the Second Boer War and World War I. During his political career, he represented the constituencies of East Fife and North Lanarkshire.

Early life
The only son of Alexander Sprot (1823-1854) of Garnkirk, Lanarkshire, of a family formerly of Edinburgh that owned a brick-making works, and Rachael Jane (daughter of Peter Cleghorn, of Stravithie), he was educated at Harrow School and at Trinity College, Cambridge.

Military career
Sprot was commissioned into the Royal Lanarkshire Militia, where he reached the rank of Lieutenant. In 1874 he was commissioned Sub-Lieutenant in the 6th Dragoon Guards. He was promoted Lieutenant in 1876, Captain in 1882, Major in 1889, Lieutenant-Colonel in 1900, and Colonel in 1904. He served in the Second Anglo-Afghan War 1879–1880 (awarded the Afghanistan Medal). He later served in the Second Boer War (for which he was awarded the Queen's South Africa Medal with 6 clasps, the King's South Africa Medal with 2 clasps, and was mentioned in despatches twice, including 31 March 1900). He retired in 1909, but later served in World War I as an Administrative Commandant from 1915 (being mentioned in despatches twice and awarded the Mons Star, Croix de Guerre, British War Medal and Victory Medal). He was appointed Companion of the Order of St Michael and St George (CMG) in the 1917 New Year Honours.

Political career
He unsuccessfully contested Montrose Burghs in 1906. In the two elections in 1910 he stood in East Fife against the Prime Minister H. H. Asquith. In 1918, Asquith was not opposed by a Coalition candidate, but the local Conservative Association decided to field a candidate against him. Sprot, despite being refused the "Coupon" – the official endorsement given by David Lloyd George and Bonar Law to Coalition candidates – defeated Asquith. Sprot sat for that constituency until he was defeated in 1922, and again in 1923. He then sat for North Lanarkshire from 1924 until his death in 1929.

Personal life
In 1879 he married Ethel Florence Thorp, daughter of Deputy Surgeon-General Edward C. Thorp, MD. They had nine daughters, of which two died in infancy. Of the other seven all married military or naval men save Alix, who took holy orders in Palestine. 
Rachel Sprot (1880-1882)
Ethel (Mice) Grace Sprot (1881-1967) married 1904, Colonel Hereward Sadler OBE DL JP.
Mabel Elizabeth Sprot (1883-1983), MBE, who married in 1904 Sir George Stirling, 9th Baronet
Alix Isabella Sprot (1884-1972), who became an Abbess in the Russian Orthodox Church Outside Russia at Bethany in Palestine.
Constance Sprot (1886-1886)
Sarah Douglas Sprot (1887-1975) married 1913, Major William Edgar Mann (1885-1969), D.S.O., of the Royal Field Artillery, son of Sir Edward Mann, 1st Baronet. Their son, Major Edward Charles Mann (1918-1959), D.S.O., M.C., 12th Royal Lancers, of The Mill House, Dunsfold, Surrey, was father of Sir Rupert Edward Mann, 3rd Baronet.
Rachel Septima Sprot (1890-1983) married 1920, Lieutenant Colonel John Reginald Noble Graham VC OBE.
Harriet Hill Sprot (1893-1976) married 1920, General Sir Thomas Sheridan Riddell-Webster GCB DSO.
Nancy Margaret Sprot (1895-1994) married 1935, Captain Chicele Keppel Bampton RN.

Sir Alexander was also Master of the Fox Hounds with the Fife Hounds. He was created a baronet in 1918.

References

External links
 

1853 births
1929 deaths
Alumni of Trinity College, Cambridge
Sprot, Sir Alexander, 1st Baronet
Carabiniers (6th Dragoon Guards) officers
Cameronians officers
British Militia officers
British military personnel of the Second Anglo-Afghan War
British Army personnel of the Second Boer War
British Army personnel of World War I
Companions of the Order of St Michael and St George
Unionist Party (Scotland) MPs
Masters of foxhounds in Scotland
Members of the Parliament of the United Kingdom for Scottish constituencies
People educated at Harrow School
Recipients of the Croix de Guerre 1914–1918 (France)
UK MPs 1918–1922
UK MPs 1924–1929
Members of the Parliament of the United Kingdom for Fife constituencies